Pereshaan Parinda is a Hindi film directed by Devesh Pratap Singh, produced by Rachel Singh, and starring Meeraj Shah, Sakshi Singh, Avtar Singh Bhullar and Sadia Nabila in lead roles. This film is the debut film of Bangladesh-born actress Sadia Nabila. It was released on 23 March 2018. The film was shot in Australia.

Cast
 Meeraj Shah -  Neel
 Sakshi Singh - Mini
 Avtar Singh Bhullar - Jai
 Sadia Nabila - Reena
Dave Sidhu - Rohan 
 KP Sandhu - Rocky
 Pankaj Kumar - Raja Bhai
 King Chouhan - Veer
 Pallavi Sharma - Maya Devi
 Rashmi Ravindran - Rhea
 Guru Dha - Gangster

Soundtrack

References

2018 films